At the 2000 Summer Olympics in Sydney, eight diving events were contested for the first time due to the inclusion of synchronized variants for each of the traditional events. The competition took place at the Sydney International Aquatic Centre, from 22 to 30 September, comprising a total of 157 divers from 42 nations.

Medal summary

Men

Women

Medal table

Participating nations
Here are listed the nations that were represented in the diving events and, in brackets, the number of national competitors.

See also
 Diving at the 1998 Commonwealth Games
 Diving at the 1999 Pan American Games
 Diving at the 2002 Commonwealth Games

References

Sources

 
 

 
2000
2000 Summer Olympics events
2000 in diving
Diving competitions in Australia